The Shops at Fallen Timbers is a retail lifestyle center in Maumee, Ohio. The mall opened in October 2007 with three anchor stores: JCPenney, Dillard's and Barnes & Noble.

History
General Growth Properties first conceived the idea of a mall in Maumee, Ohio in the mid-1990s. Initially, the mall was to have been an enclosed project, but in 2003, the company decided on building a lifestyle center. Stores that were proposed to open at the mall included Sears, Galyan's, Kaufmann's and Parisian.

In October 2007, the mall opened for business with Barnes & Noble, JCPenney and Dillard's, the latter of which moved from two stores at nearby Southwyck Mall, as its anchor stores. Two months later, Showcase Cinemas opened a multiplex theater complex at the mall. Upon opening, the mall included several tenants new to the Toledo market, such as P.F. Chang's and White House/Black Market.

In December 2017, the property was sold to Mason Asset Management & Namdar Realty Group for $21 million.

References

External links
Official website

Lifestyle centers (retail)
Shopping malls established in 2007
Shopping malls in the Toledo, Ohio metro area
Namdar Realty Group